Pompeius Probus ( 307–314) was a politician of the Roman Empire during the Tetrarchy, active at the Eastern court under Emperors Galerius and Licinius.

Life 
Probus was a member of the Petronii Probi, a family of the senatorial aristocracy. His son Petronius Probianus was consul in 322, and his granddaughter was the poet Faltonia Proba.

Around 307 Probus was sent by Galerius as an envoy to Maxentius, together with Licinius. Between 310 and 314 he was appointed Praetorian prefect of the East. Since he was a man of the Eastern court, his appointment to the consulship, in 310, was not recognised either by Maxentius, who controlled Rome, or by Constantine I, who ruled over Gaul, and was thus effective only in the East.

Sources 
 Arnold Hugh Martin Jones, John Robert Martindale, John Morris, "Pompeius Probus 6", Prosopography of the Later Roman Empire, volume 1, Cambridge University Press, 1971, p. 740.
 Lieu, Samuel N., and Dominic Montserrat eds., From Constantine to Julian: A Source History, Routledge, 1995, p. 53.

4th-century Romans
Imperial Roman consuls
Probus
Praetorian prefects of the East